Dolce Vita was a pizzeria in Houston, in the U.S. state of Texas. Known for Neapolitan pizzas, pastas, and antipasti, the restaurant opened in January 2006 and closed in May 2020, after owner Marco Wiles announced plans to sell the building and property in mid 2019. The restaurant was sold to an investment group and employees were relocated to other restaurants owned by Wiles. Wiles kept the rights to the "Dolca Vita concept".

References

External links

 
 Dolce Vita Pizzeria & Enoteca at Houston Press
 Dolce Vita at Thrillist
 Dolce Vita Pizzeria Enoteca at Zagat
 Dolce Vita Pizzeria Enoteca at Zomato

2006 establishments in Texas
2020 disestablishments in Texas
Defunct restaurants in Houston
Italian restaurants in Texas
Neartown, Houston
Pizzerias in the United States
Restaurants disestablished during the COVID-19 pandemic
Restaurants disestablished in 2020
Restaurants established in 2006
Defunct pizzerias